This is a list of electoral results for the Electoral district of Laverton in Victorian state elections.

Members for Laverton

Election results

Elections in the 2020s

References

Victoria (Australia) state electoral results by district
2022 establishments in Australia